Maney is an area in England.

Maney may also refer to:

Maney, Minnesota, a community in the United States
Maney Publishing, a publishing company
Maney (surname), a list of people with the surname Maney